China competed in the 1993 East Asian Games which were held in Shanghai, China from May 9, 1993 to May 18, 1993.

See also
 China at the Asian Games
 China at the Olympics
 Sports in China

1993 East Asian Games
1993
1993 in Chinese sport